Cho Sonjin (born April 18, 1970) is a professional Go player.

Cho was born in South Korea, but moved to Japan at age 12 in order to become a professional. He accomplished his goal two years later in 1984. He was promoted to 9 dan in 1998. In 1999, he defeated Cho Chikun in the Honinbo, ending Chikun's 10-year run with the title.

Titles and runners-up

See also
Go players

External links
GoBase Profile
趙善津 Nihon Ki-in Profile 

1970 births
Living people
South Korean Go players